Gimnazija Šentvid (/ɡimnaziya ʃɛntvid/) is a secondary school in Šentvid district of Ljubljana, Slovenia. "Gimnazija" can be translated from Slovenian as high school or secondary school. The astronomical group of Gimnazija Šentvid and the Astronomical Society Vega - Ljubljana cooperate.

External links
Gimnazija Šentvid official website
Location of Gimnazija Šentvid on google maps

Secondary schools in Slovenia
Schools in Ljubljana